Cereceda is one of 24 parishes (administrative divisions) in Piloña, a municipality within the province and autonomous community of Asturias, in northern Spain.

The population is 239 (INE 2011).

Villages
 Berducedo (Berducéu)
 Braniella
 Caldevilla
 Cereceda (Cerecea)
 Cantodova (Cantudova)
 La Bárcena
 La Braña
 La Naveda
 Los Collados (Los Collaos)
 Mercoria (La Mercoria)
 Robledo (Robléu)
 Sardeda (Sardea)
 Sementada (La Sementada)
 Tresabueli (Tresagüeli)

References

Parishes in Piloña